Olukorede S. Yishau is a Nigerian author and journalist. He was long listed for the 2021 Nigeria Prize for Literature.

Early life and career
Yishau was born Somolu, Lagos State. He studied mass communication at Ambrose Alli University, Ekpoma. He has worked as a journalist at The Source, Tell Magazine and is currently an Associate Editor at The Nation newspaper.

Bibliography

References

Nigerian journalists
Living people
Nigerian media journalists
Yoruba journalists
1978 births